Classified is a studio album by the New Orleans pianist James Booker, released in 1982. It was reissued in an expanded edition in 2013.

Production
The album was produced by Scott Billington, who recorded several sessions with Booker in 1982. The sessions were at times interrupted by Booker's odd behavior or his stints in jail. Classified captures both solo and quartet recordings; Booker's Maple Leaf Bar band included bassist James Singleton, saxophonist Alvin Tyler, and drummer Johnny Vidacovich. The Professor Longhair medley came to an abrupt end when Booker left mid-song in order to cash a check.

Critical reception
Robert Christgau wrote that "in general there's too much reliance on the left hand, with the consequent loss of dynamic subtlety compounded by a klutzy drum mix." The Philadelphia Daily News praised Booker's "great stomping piano, [which is] not quite as fervent as Fats Domino or as idiosyncratic as Professor Longhair, but mightily infectious all the same." 

AllMusic called the album "one of the great blues albums of the early '80s."

Track listing

Personnel
James Booker - piano
James Singleton - bass
Alvin Tyler - saxophone
Johnny Vidacovich - drums

References

1982 albums
Rounder Records albums